Rear-Admiral John Phillip Edwards  (13 February 1927 – 12 December 2014) was a Royal Navy officer who later became bursar of Wadham College, University of Oxford. He was a trustee of the Oxford Preservation Trust.

References

1927 births
2014 deaths
Royal Navy rear admirals
People from Ruthin
Companions of the Order of the Bath
Members of the Royal Victorian Order
People associated with Wadham College, Oxford